The  La Crosse Spartans season was the team's first season as a football franchise and first in the Indoor Football League (IFL). One of twenty-five teams competing in the IFL for the 2010 season, the Spartans were members of the Central North Division of the United Conference. The team played their home games at the La Crosse Center in La Crosse, Wisconsin.

Schedule

Preseason

Regular season

Roster

Standings

References

La Crosse Spartans
La Crosse Spartans seasons
La Crosse Spartans